Radłów is a town in Lesser Poland Voivodeship, southern Poland.

Radłów may also refer to the following villages:
 Radłów, Greater Poland Voivodeship (west-central Poland)
 Radłów, Opole Voivodeship (south-west Poland)

See also 
 Radlov (Radloff)